Barbara Dittrich (born May 21, 1964) is an American politician. She was elected to the Wisconsin State Assembly as a Republican in 2018, defeating Democratic candidate Melissa Winker 57.6 percent to 42.4 percent. She represents District 38. On March 7, 2022 Dittrich’s daughter Mallory pleaded guilty to  felony possession with intent to deliver psilocin and a misdemeanor charge of carrying a concealed weapon.

Political positions 
She endorsed Patrick Testin in the 2022 Wisconsin gubernatorial election.

References

External links 
 Twitter

1964 births
Living people
Politicians from Milwaukee
People from Oconomowoc, Wisconsin
University of Wisconsin–Milwaukee alumni
Women state legislators in Wisconsin
Republican Party members of the Wisconsin State Assembly
21st-century American politicians
21st-century American women politicians